The Korean People's Army Naval Force (KPANF; Korean: 조선인민군 해군; Hanja: 朝鮮人民軍 海軍; Chosŏn-inmingun Haegun) or the Korean People's Navy (KPN), is the naval service branch of the Korean People's Army, which contains each branch of the North Korean armed forces.

There are some 780 vessels including 70 midget submarines (including the Yono-class submarine and Sang-O-class submarine), 20 Romeo-class submarines, and about 140 air cushioned landing craft.

The North Korean navy is considered a brown-water (or riverine) navy and operates mainly within the 50 kilometer exclusion zone. The fleet consists of east and west coast squadrons, which cannot support each other in the event of war with South Korea. The limited range of its vessels means that, even in peacetime, it is virtually impossible for a ship on one coast to visit the other coast.

History 

The KPN was established on 5 June 1946.

Naval engagements of the Korean People's Army Naval Force
 Landing operation near Kangnung and Samcheok (25–26 June 1950)
Battle of Chumonchin Chan (2 July 1950)
Battle of Haeju (10 September 1950)
Pueblo incident (23 January 1968)
Gangneung Infiltration (17 September - 5 November 1996)
Battle of Yosu (17–18 December 1998)
First Battle of Yeonpyeong (9–15 June 1999)
Battle of Amami-Ōshima (22 December 2001)
Second Battle of Yeonpyeong (29 June 2002)
Battle of Daecheong (10 November 2009)
ROKS Cheonan sinking (26 March 2010)

2013 submarine chaser sinking 
On 13 October 2013, submarine chaser number 233 departed on a regular patrol, but failed to return on time. The boat was later discovered to be sunk, and the entire crew had died, who were named as martyrs. A seaside grave was constructed for these sailors, which Kim Jong-un visited, in a move described by the New York Times as bolstering his image of caring for the soldiers. Families of the victims were given portraits of their children and a collage of the grave.

Reported 2016 submarine sinking
On 11 March 2016, CNN and the U.S. Naval Institute News reported that unnamed US officials believed a North Korean submarine had been lost at sea in the Sea of Japan. According to reports, the U.S. military had been observing the submarine when it "stopped" before the North Korean navy was observed by American satellites, aircraft and ships to be searching the area.

Organization
According to the Defense Intelligence Agency, the 146,000-man Korean Peoples' Army Navy (KPAN) is primarily a coastal navy. The KPAN is organized into two fleets: the East Coast Fleet, with eight operational commands, and the West Coast Fleet, with five operational commands. The East Coast Fleet is headquartered at Toejo Dong, with major bases at Najin and Wonsan.

The West Coast Fleet is headquartered at Nampo, with major bases at Pipagot and Sagon Ni. Numerous smaller naval bases are located along both coasts. The fleets do not exchange vessels because geographical limitations make mutual support almost impossible. The KPAN does not have a Marine Corps or naval aviation capabilities. Amphibious operations are conducted by SOF units in addition to naval personnel.

According to South Korea's National Intelligence Service (in 1999):

The Times puts the total in 2009 at "420 warships and 60 submarines."

The annual report of North Korea's military capabilities by the U.S. Department of Defense, released in early 2014, identified the North Korean Navy's strength at 60,000 personnel, 70 submarines, 420 gun boats, 260 amphibious landing craft, 30 mine warfare vessels, and 30 support ships.

Inventory

Most KPAN vessels are small patrol-size craft unable to operate over 50 nautical miles (NM) from the coast but capable of policing the DPRK's territorial waters. The navy's numerous amphibious craft and midget submarines are intended to clandestinely insert SOF units into the ROK. The DPRK also maintains coastal defense artillery and missile sites. Coastal defense artillery includes 122 mm, 130 mm, and 152 mm systems. Land-based coastal defense missiles include the KS-1 Komet, Silkworm (HY-1 and HY-2) .

The KPAN's most capable weapons systems are their approximately 43 guided-missile patrol boats equipped with the P-15 Termit antiship missile (or its Chinese version, the Silkworm (SY-1)). Though their small size limits operations to coastal waters and calm seas, they have a capability to quickly respond to Combined Forces Command (CFC) shipping approaching the coast. The KPAN has 12 Osa-class missile boat, 10 DPRK versions of the Osa-1 called the Soju,
and 19 other fast-attack missile craft; the Osa and Osa are all equipped with four Silkworm (SY-1) missile launchers. The missiles have a maximum range of 25 Nm and carry radar or infrared homing seekers.

The largest part of the KPAN consists of small combatants, including torpedo boats, patrol boats, patrol craft, fast attack craft, and small amphibious landing craft. Of the approximately 200 torpedo boats, nearly half are DPRK-built. Most are equipped with 25 mm to 37 mm guns. The DPRK built at least 62 Chaho fire-support patrol units. This unique vessel has a multiple rocket launcher in the center of its deck to provide fire support to ground troops or attack surface ships.

The DPRK's attack submarine inventory is estimated to include 4 former Soviet Whiskey class submarine, 22 Chinese Romeo Class submarines, and DPRK-built Romeo Class submarines. The Whiskeys, acquired in the 1960s, can carry 12 torpedoes or 24 mines. Shortly after delivering four Romeos in the early 1970s, China helped the DPRK start its own Romeo construction program. The Romeos are well equipped, have an improved sonar, and can carry 14 torpedoes or 28 mines.

To date, the DPRK has indigenously produced over 200 personnel landing craft. This includes approximately 100 Nampo personnel landing craft based on a former Soviet P-6 torpedo boat hull. The Nampos provide a limited amphibious capability, each carrying up to 30 troops with a basic combat load. Amphibious assaults against CFC probably would be small, clandestine landings involving two to six Nampo craft; Chaho or other naval craft could provide fire support. Other amphibious craft include 8 Hantae medium landing ships, which can carry 3 to 4 light tanks, and approximately 125 Kongbang amphibious hovercraft.

The DPRK has a credible mine warfare capability. There are numerous small surface ships that are capable of delivering mines within both the navy and civilian sectors. Mines will be used to defend against amphibious assaults, defend strategic ports, and provide seaward flank protection for land forces. Defensive mine fields will be monitored by coastal observation teams and radar, and they will be supported by well emplaced artillery and missile batteries. This will make close approach and mine clearing operations extremely hazardous. DPRK has a large inventory of older technology mines, significant historical experience with their effectiveness, and, most importantly, the willingness to use them.

The latest bi-annual report of North Korea's military capabilities by the ROK's Ministry of National Defense, released in 2018, KPN inventory is estimated at 430 combat ships, 250 landing crafts, 20 mine layers, 40 support ships, 70 submarines.

Modernization 
For years, the Korean People's Army Naval Force stagnated with a number of ships becoming old and weapons turning obsolete, this peaked with an accident during drills, when the Chosun Ilbo reported that in mid-October 2013, one of the DPRK's Hainan Class submarine chasers and one of its smaller patrol boats sank during maneuvers in the Sea of Japan with an unknown loss of life.

After 2013 surfaced on western analysis, a number of upgrades and new classes in service with the Navy appeared: most of this modernization's program is left to speculation and analysis of satellite images, due to the absence of details released by North Korea.

South Korea reported that North Korea has built a new high-speed, wave piercing craft to deploy troops as part of efforts to enhance infiltration capabilities by sea. Called a Very Slender Vessel (VSV), it is cylindrical with a small cross section to pierce through waves at high speed. VSVs are considered one of the most threatening craft in the Korean People's Army Naval Force for their commando infiltration capabilities onto border islands.

North Korea has built two helicopter frigates to enhance its anti-submarine warfare capabilities. Construction began in 2006-07 and launched in 2011–12, but it is unknown if they have been commissioned and are in service. Armament is believed to include 4 RBU 1200 ASW rocket launchers, a 30 mm CIWS, and possibly the C-802 missile. Its main weapon is either a Mil Mi-4 or Mil Mi-14 helicopter.

In June 2014, propaganda pictures from the North Korean state TV briefly showed one of the newly built patrol SES vessels, firing a Kh-35 anti-ship cruise missile. Despite some initial doubts over the nature of the missile, they appear to be built in North Korea and have been exported to Myanmar (earlier speculations believed they were imported from Myanmar). The missile gives the KPN the potential to considerably improve its anti-surface missiles.
Kh-35 missiles were also installed during 2014 on one of the two old Najin-class frigates (replacing the previous obsolete KN-01 missiles): the ship also received upgrades in gunnery.

In autumn 2014, satellite images identified a newly built submarine of a new class: with a length of 67metres, it's the largest-ever submarine built so far by North Korea, it's believed to be related to older Yugoslavian projects, but if mass-built could potentially replace the aging fleet of Romeo submarines.

In spring 2015, the new submarine was observed at sea during trials, paired with a test of the KN-11 missile.

Structure

Bases
The KPN has 20 bases split between the two coasts (Sea of Japan and Yellow Sea) with major and minor bases:

West Sea Fleet
The western fleet has approximately 300 watercraft (administrative, operational and logistic support), berthing facility for Yellow Sea Fleet; home to shipyard and sub base
 Ch'o-do: small support base and home to Sq­ron 9 (Fast Attack Craft)
 Haeju: major naval base and ship repair facility close to Demarcation Line
 Kwangyang-ni
 Pip'a-got: limited operational and logistical support to patrol craft; also home to some subs
 Sagot (Sagon-ni): home to Sq­ron 8
 Sunwi-do
 Tasa-ri: small naval base
 Yomju (Yomju-gun)
 Yongwi-do

East Sea Fleet
The eastern fleet has approximately 470 ships and small craft.
 Ch'aho (Ch'aho-nodongjagu) - one of two sub bases in North Korea
 Ch'angjon: home base for smaller patrol boats
 Mayangdo: operation and logistical support for submarines, antisubmarine craft, and patrol craft; one of 2 sub bases in North Korea
 Mugyepo: base for patrol boats, landing crafts and frigate
 Puam Dong: base for patrol boats, landing craft
 Puam-ni: small base for landing craft and patrol boats
 Rason (Rajin): major naval operating and training centre
 Songjon-Pando: support base for patrol and missile boats; part of the larger Wonsan naval/maritime complex
 T'oejo-dong: base for patrol boats and 1 frigate
 Wonsan (Munch'on): large maritime complex and HQ for the eastern fleet

Some ships are domestically built at Wonsan and Nampho shipyards. Southern bases on each coasts are used to organize infiltrations into South Korea and Japan.

Weapons
 MSI Yukto I/II countermeasures
   Oto Melara 76 mm
Similar to Soviet dual  AK-230.
  Pukguksong-3 4 5
   R-27 Zyb, KN-11 SLBM (if KN-08 is derived from obtained R-29)
   BM25 Musudan 
  Hwasal-2
   Kumsong-3 in coastal defense configuration.
  Kh-28
  C-602 YJ62
  C802 YJ82
   Silkworm missiles, KN-1
   P-15 Termits, KN-1
  P-35s
  SA-16 9K310 Igla-1 SAM system
  122 mm (5 in) gun M1931/37 (A-19) guns
 SM-4-1
  M-1992 130 mm self-propelled gun
  152 mm (6 in) howitzer-gun M1937 (ML-20) ML towed artillery

Ranks and uniforms

Commissioned officer ranks
The rank insignia of commissioned officers.

Other ranks
The rank insignia of non-commissioned officers and enlisted personnel.

Uniforms
The naval officers wear black jackets and pants with blue shirt and dark tie underneath. Their peaked caps are from the Soviet era. In summer jackets are white in the full dress uniform.

Junior ratings and seamen wear white shirts (in the summer) or navy blue shirts (in the winter) with black/white jackets and slacks (skirts for women) and wear sailor caps.

All ranks wear shoulder and collar insignia while all officers, flag officers included, wear sleeve insignia as well in their service blue uniforms.

Anniversary
At first, an ordinance issued by the Supreme People's Assembly on June 3, 1972, designated August 28 as the Navy Day, claiming that the first leader Kim Il-sung organized the Torpedo Unit on that date of 1949. In 1993 the North Korean authorities changed it to June 5, as its "Maritime Security Corps" were organized on June 5, 1946.

See also

 Northern Limit Line
 Korean Demilitarized Zone
 Defense Industry of North Korea
 Republic of Korea Armed Forces
 Republic of Korea Navy
 Korean People's Army Ground Force
 Korean People's Army Air and Anti-Air Force

References

External links
 Korean People's Army Navy
 US Navy Ship Classification Symbols
 Military and Security Developments Involving the Democratic People's Republic of Korea 2012
 “Everything You Need to Know about North Korea's Navy” National Interest

 
 
Military units and formations established in 1946